The Ravah Party is a political party in Mauritania led by Mohamed Ould Vall.

History
The party won three seats in the 2013 parliamentary elections.

References

Political parties in Mauritania